Jervis Inlet is one of the principal inlets of the British Columbia Coast, about  northwest of Vancouver, and the third of such inlets north of the 49th parallel, the first of which is Burrard Inlet, Vancouver's harbour.

Geography
It stretches  from its head at the mouth of the short Skwawka River to its opening into the Strait of Georgia near Texada Island.

The inlet is made up of three arms or reaches:
 Prince of Wales Reach
 Princess Royal Reach
 Queens Reach

At its uppermost stretch is Queens Reach, which takes a sharp right-angle often seen in fjord areas, to become Princess Royal Reach.

The most frequented and best known inlet in the area is Princess Louisa Inlet, with the Malibu Club and Young Life Camp at the Malibu Rapids, the entrance of the inlet, and Princess Louisa Marine Provincial Park, including Chatterbox Falls, at its head.

At the mouth of Jervis Inlet a passenger and vehicle ferry operated by BC Ferries connects Earls Cove (on the upper end of the Sechelt Peninsula and lower Sunshine Coast) with Saltery Bay (on the bottom end of the Malaspina Peninsula and upper Sunshine Coast).

The mouth of Sechelt Inlet connects with Jervis Inlet in the area of Earls Cove.

Population is sparse on the shores of Jervis Inlet and there is no road access to the area. Industry includes small operations in aquaculture, commercial fishing and logging, but a substantial number of independent power projects are expected to develop in coming years.

Climate

History

The head of Jervis Inlet was once a seasonal settlement of one of the four groups that make up today's amalgamated Shishalh, who called it xénichen (often anglicized as Hunaechin).

George Vancouver named the inlet after the 1791–1795 expedition to search for the fabled Northwest Passage. In the Royal Navy tradition, Vancouver named this main waterway after his friend Rear Admiral Sir John Jervis (Earl of St. Vincent) for his victory over the Spanish fleet on February 14, 1797 at Cape St. Vincent in Portugal. He named St. Vincent's Bay (near the entrance of Jervis Inlet) after the location of the battle, St. Vincent Bay.

The waterways named during this survey mission were: Princess Louisa Inlet, Queens Reach, Princess Royal Reach, and Prince of Wales Reach. Also named were the main mountains of the area:
Mount Alfred
Mount Frederick William
Mount Arthur
Mount Wellington
Mount Alice
Mount Victoria
Mount Helena
Mount Albert

In the early 1900s, logging and commercial fishing developed in the Jervis Inlet area. Relatively large logging camps operated at Goliath Bay, Vancouver Bay and Hotham Sound, commercial fishing was conducted by owner-operators based in Egmont, Pender Harbour and Saltery Bay, and several fish-processing plants operated in Egmont, Pender Harbour and Saltery Bay.

Gallery

References

External links

Deep Water Properties of Jervis Inlet Department of Fisheries and Oceans.
CM_C2308 Fraser River to N.E.Pt. of Texada Island including Howe Sound and Jervis Inlet 'Annotated'  1863.02.16 1865.08

Fjords of British Columbia
Sunshine Coast (British Columbia)
Inlets of British Columbia